Samuel Webber (1759 – July 17, 1810) was an American Congregational clergyman, mathematician, academic, and president of Harvard University from 1806 until his death in 1810.

Biography
Samuel Webber was born in Byfield, Massachusetts in 1759. He was educated at Dummer Academy (now known as The Governor's Academy) and Harvard College (B.A., 1784; M.A., 1787) where he distinguished himself in mathematics. He was a member of the Hasty Pudding. Webber was ordained as Congregational minister in 1787 and two years later became Hollis Professor of Mathematick and Natural Philosophy at Harvard. He served in the commission that drew the boundaries, later recognized by the Treaty of Paris, between the new United States of America and the surrounding British provinces. He was elected a Fellow of the American Academy of Arts and Sciences in 1789 and also served as vice-president of the Academy. He authored System of Mathematics, which for many years served as the only textbook on the subject in New England.

Webber was appointed president of Harvard in 1806. That same year he received an honorary Doctor of Divinity degree from that institution.  He led Harvard until his death in Cambridge, Massachusetts on July 17, 1810.

Family
Webber's son, Samuel Jr., married Anna Winslow Green, a granddaughter of David Mathews, Loyalist Mayor of New York City under the British during the American Revolution.  Webber's son, also named Samuel (September 15, 1797 Cambridge, Massachusetts – December 5, 1880 Charlestown, New Hampshire), was a distinguished physician, chemist and author.

Works
 “Introduction” to Jedidiah Morse, American Universal Geography, 1796 (revision)
 System of Mathematics, (2 vols.), 1801
 Eulogy on President Willard, 1804

References

18th-century American mathematicians
19th-century American mathematicians
Harvard College alumni
Presidents of Harvard University
American Congregationalists
Fellows of the American Academy of Arts and Sciences
1759 births
1810 deaths
Hollis Chair of Mathematics and Natural Philosophy
Hasty Pudding alumni
The Governor's Academy alumni